Conselve is a comune (municipality) in the Province of Padua in the Italian region Veneto, located about  southwest of Venice and about  south of Padua.

The municipality of Conselve contains the frazione (subdivisions, mainly villages and hamlets) Palù and Beolo.

Conselve borders the following municipalities: Arre, Bagnoli di Sopra, Cartura, San Pietro Viminario, Terrassa Padovana, Tribano.

Demographic evolution

Twin towns
Conselve is twinned with:

  Torcy, Saône-et-Loire, France
  Jászberény, Hungary

References

External links
 www.comune.conselve.it

Cities and towns in Veneto